Cornell may refer to:

People

Surname
Cornell is an English and Dutch Surname, which derives from the Latin Cornelius. Sometimes the name is an Americanized form of the Czech Kornel, or the German and Swedish Kornell.
Alonzo B. Cornell (1832–1904), American businessman and Governor of New York
Bo Cornell (born 1949), American football player
Brian Cornell, (born 1960), American businessman
Charles G. Cornell (born 1827), New York politician
Chris Cornell (1964–2017), American musician
David Cornell (born 1991), Welsh footballer
Dewey Cornell, American psychologist
Don Cornell (1919–2004), American singer
Eric Allin Cornell (born 1961), American physicist
Ezekiel Cornell (1732–1800), American delegate from Rhode Island to the Continental Congress
Ezra Cornell (1807–1874), American businessman and co-founder of Cornell University
George Cornell ( – 1966), English criminal and murder victim
George W. Cornell (1896–1988), New York politician
James Cornell (1874–1946), Australian politician
Jashon Cornell (born 1997), American football player
John Cornell (1941–2021), Australian actor and producer
Joseph Cornell (1903–1972), American artist
Julien Davies Cornell, American lawyer and pacifist who defended Ezra Pound
Katharine Cornell (1892–1974), American stage actress
Lyn Cornell (born 1940), English pop and jazz singer
Paul Cornell (born 1967), British writer
Paul Cornell (lawyer) (1822–1904), American lawyer and real estate speculator
Ralph D. Cornell (1890–1972), an American landscape architect from Los Angeles, California
Rick Cornell, American professional wrestler
Robert John Cornell (1919–2009), American priest and politician representing Wisconsin in the House of Representatives
Thomas Cornell (disambiguation), several people
Sarah Maria Cornell, victim in the murder trial of Methodist minister Ephraim Kingsbury Avery
Vincent Cornell, American scholar of Islam
Ward Cornell (1924–2000), Canadian broadcaster and educator

Given name
Cornell Armstrong (born 1995), American football player
Cornell N. Dypski (1931–2009), American politician
Cornell Gowdy (born 1963), American football player
Cornell Powell (born 1997), American football player

Places

Canada
Cornell, Ontario

United States
Cornell, Los Angeles County, California
Cornell, Modoc County, California
Cornell, Illinois
Cornell, Iowa
Cornell, Wisconsin
Cornell Township, Michigan

Schools
United States
Cornell University, New York, an Ivy League university
Cornell College, Iowa, a liberal arts college
Cornell School District (Allegheny County, Pennsylvania), a public school district
Cornell School District (Cornell, Wisconsin), a public school district
Cornell School (Alexandria, Ohio), a former one-room schoolhouse

Other uses
The Cornells, a musical group
Cornell Big Red, the athletic program of Cornell University
Cornell Lab of Ornithology, a unit of Cornell University
Cornell Box, a rendering software accuracy test
Cornell Companies, a corrections services company
Cornell Notes, a note-taking system
Cornell Prize, a former art prize awarded in Australia
Fairchild Cornell, an aircraft
 Cornell, a character in the Castlevania series

See also
Cornel (disambiguation)
Justice Cornell (disambiguation)
Cornelius